The Chambers Street station is an express station on the IRT Broadway–Seventh Avenue Line of the New York City Subway, located at the intersection of Chambers Street and West Broadway in Lower Manhattan. It is served by the 1 and 2 trains at all times, and by the 3 train at all times except late nights.

The station was built by the Interborough Rapid Transit Company (IRT) as part of the Dual Contracts with New York City, and opened on July 1, 1918. Its platforms were extended in the 1960s, and elevators were installed in the 2000s, making the station compliant with the Americans with Disabilities Act of 1990.

History

Construction and opening

The Dual Contracts, which were signed on March 19, 1913, were contracts for the construction and/or rehabilitation and operation of rapid transit lines in the City of New York. The contracts were "dual" in that they were signed between the City and two separate private companies (the Interborough Rapid Transit Company and the Brooklyn Rapid Transit Company), all working together to make the construction of the Dual Contracts possible. The Dual Contracts promised the construction of several lines in Brooklyn. As part of Contract 4, the IRT agreed to build a branch of the original subway line south down Seventh Avenue, Varick Street, and West Broadway to serve the West Side of Manhattan.

The construction of this line, in conjunction with the construction of the Lexington Avenue Line, would change the operations of the IRT system. Instead of having trains go via Broadway, turning onto 42nd Street, before finally turning onto Park Avenue, there would be two trunk lines connected by the 42nd Street Shuttle. The system would be changed from looking like a "Z" system on a map to an "H" system. One trunk would run via the new Lexington Avenue Line down Park Avenue, and the other trunk would run via the new Seventh Avenue Line up Broadway. In order for the line to continue down Varick Street and West Broadway, these streets needed to be widened, and two new streets were built, the Seventh Avenue Extension and the Varick Street Extension. It was predicted that the subway extension would lead to the growth of the Lower West Side, and to neighborhoods such as Chelsea and Greenwich Village.

Chambers Street opened as part of an extension of the line from 34th Street–Penn Station to South Ferry on July 1, 1918. Initially, the station was served by a shuttle running from Times Square to South Ferry. The new "H" system was implemented on August 1, 1918, joining the two halves of the Broadway–Seventh Avenue Line and sending all West Side trains south from Times Square. An immediate result of the switch was the need to transfer using the 42nd Street Shuttle in order to retrace the original layout. The completion of the "H" system doubled the capacity of the IRT system.

Later years
The city government took over the IRT's operations on June 12, 1940. On August 9, 1964, the New York City Transit Authority (NYCTA) announced the letting of a $7.6 million contract to lengthen platforms at stations on the Broadway—Seventh Avenue Line from Rector Street to 34th Street–Penn Station, including Chambers Street, and stations from Central Park North–110th Street to 145th Street on the Lenox Avenue Line to allow express trains to be lengthened from nine-car trains to ten-car trains, and to lengthen locals from eight-car trains to ten-car trains. With the completion of this project, the NYCTA project to lengthen IRT stations to accommodate ten-car trains would be complete.

The station was renovated between 2007 and 2009. Three elevators were installed in the station (two from platform level to the mezzanine and one from fare control to the streets) to make it accessible for people with disabilities under the Americans with Disabilities Act of 1990.

Station layout

This underground station has four tracks and two island platforms. The 1 and 2 trains stop here at all times, and the 3 train stops here at all times except late nights. South of this station, the 2 and 3 trains curve sharply east and branch off to Park Place, Fulton Street, Wall Street, and then Brooklyn. The 1 train continues in a more direct southerly orientation towards its terminal, South Ferry.

North of the station are diamond crossovers in both directions, allowing the 2 train to run local during late nights, switching over to the express tracks north of Chambers Street and then heading to Brooklyn.

Exits
The station's only exits are through the mezzanine above the center of the station. Street stairs lead to four of the five corners of the intersection of Chambers Street, Hudson Streets, and West Broadway. The only corner without a street stair is the wedge between Hudson Street and West Broadway on the intersection's northern side, where the James Bogardus Plaza is located. The southwest corner of the intersection has two stairs. There is an elevator located at the northwestern corner of Chambers and Hudson Streets.

Nearby points of interest
Brookfield Place
World Trade Center
Borough of Manhattan Community College
Stuyvesant High School
New York Law School

References

Further reading 
 Stokey, Lee (1994). Subway Ceramics: A History and Iconography. .

External links 

 
 MTA's Arts For Transit – Chambers Street/Park Place (IRT Broadway–Seventh Avenue Line)

IRT Broadway–Seventh Avenue Line stations
New York City Subway stations in Manhattan
Railway and subway stations on the National Register of Historic Places in Manhattan
Railway stations in the United States opened in 1918
1918 establishments in New York City
Tribeca
Financial District, Manhattan